The Slovenia women's national under-19 volleyball team represents Slovenia in international women's volleyball competitions under the age of 19 and is controlled by the Volleyball Federation of Slovenia, which is an affiliate of the Federation of International Volleyball (FIVB) and also a part of the European Volleyball Confederation (CEV).

History

Results

Summer Youth Olympics
 Champions   Runners up   Third place   Fourth place

FIVB U19 World Championship
 Champions   Runners up   Third place   Fourth place

Europe U18 / U17 Championship
 Champions   Runners up   Third place   Fourth place

Team

Current squad

The following is the Slovenian roster in the 2017 FIVB Girls' U18 World Championship.

Head coach: Joze Casar

References

External links
Official website
FIVB profile

 

National women's under-18 volleyball teams
Volleyball
Volleyball in Slovenia